KMEM may refer to:

 the ICAO code for Memphis International Airport, in Memphis, Tennessee, United States
 KMEM-FM, a radio station (100.5 FM) licensed to Memphis, Missouri, United States
 A Linux system device which allows examination of computer memory